Fugitive at Large is a 1939 American crime film directed by Lewis D. Collins and starring Jack Holt, Patricia Ellis and Stanley Fields.

Cast
 Jack Holt as Tom Farrow / George Storm 
 Patricia Ellis as Patricia Farrow 
 Stanley Fields as Manning 
 Guinn 'Big Boy' Williams as Conway 
 Arthur Hohl as Curtis 
 Weldon Heyburn as Corrick 
 Donald Douglas as Stevens 
 Leon Ames as Carter 
 Cy Kendall as Prison Guard Captain 
 Hal Taliaferro as Truck Guard 
 Edward LeSaint as Judge

References

Bibliography
 Slide, Anthony. The New Historical Dictionary of the American Film Industry. Routledge, 2014.

External links
 

1939 films
1939 crime films
1930s English-language films
American crime films
Films directed by Lewis D. Collins
Columbia Pictures films
1930s American films